The Canadian men's national inline hockey team is the national team for Canada, based in Lethbridge, Alberta (Roller Hockey Canada) and Richmond Hill, Ontario (Inline Canada). The team is controlled by Roller Hockey Canada (previous known as: the National Inline Hockey Association - Canada) for IIHF events and Inline Canada for FIRS events.

History
Initially, the Canadian national team was administered by Hockey Canada. It made an appearance in the first three IIHF Inline Hockey World Championships, winning silver in 1996 and 1997. In 1998, the Canadian squad defeated the two-time world Champions United States, in the gold medal game to win the first gold medal in country history. Following the 1998 World Championships, Canada withdrew from international competition. Hockey Canada shut down their inline hockey program in 2000.

Following Hockey Canada's shut down of their program, two separate governing bodies emerged. Roller Hockey Canada (previous known as: The National Inline Hockey Association - Canada) for IIHF related events and the Canadian Inline Hockey Association, which became Inline Canada in 2003 for all FIRS related events. The two programs are both recognized by certain bodies as Canada's national inline hockey team. Roller Hockey Canada (NIHA-Canada) is recognized by Hockey Canada and USA Hockey as the national team. Inline Canada is recognized by the Canadian Olympic Committee as the national team, through the IOC's recognition of the FIRS as the international organizer of inline hockey.

The 2002 FIRS Men's Inline Hockey World Championships marked Canada's return to international competition. The team won gold at the tournament.

The 2008 Men's World Inline Hockey Championships marked Canada's returned to IIHF competition. The team was led by Head Coach Gerry St Cyr and Assistant player coach Michael Hunt. Team Canada won the IIHF Division 1 World Championship in 2008

As well, Canada has participated in the inline hockey competitions at the Pan-American Games and the World Games.

Current Rosters

2017 IIHF World Championship roster

Coaching Staff
 Head Coach: Jason Stephens
 General Manager: Kirk Jensen
 Equipment Manager: Jarrad Davies
 Physiotherapist: Rebecca Henderson

--

2012 IIHF World Championship Roster (Gold) 

2012 Coaching Staff

 Head Coach: Jason Stephens
 General Manager: Nathan Fleck
 Equipment Manager: Jarrad Davies
 Physiotherapist: Rebecca Henderson

--

2012 FIRS World Championship roster

Coaching Staff
 Head Coach: Richard Ropchan
 Assistant: Chad Ropchan
 Athletic Therapist: Cary Grant

World Championship results by year

IIHF Version
1996 - Won Silver Medal
1997 - Won Silver Medal
1998 - Won Gold Medal
2008 - 9th Place - Division I Gold Medal
2009 - 7th Place - A Pool
2010 - 4th Place
2011 - Won Bronze Medal
2012 - Won Gold Medal
2013 - Won Bronze Medal
2014 - Won Silver Medal
2015 - Won Gold Medal
2017 - 6th Place

FIRS Version
1995 - Won Silver Medal
1997 - Won Silver Medal
1998 - 4th Place
2002 - Won Gold Medal
2003 - Won Bronze Medal
2004 - Won Silver Medal
2006 - Won Bronze Medal
2007 - Won Bronze Medal
2008 - 6th Place
2009 - Won Silver Medal
2010 - 6th Place
2011 - 4th Place
2012 - Won Silver Medal

References

External links
Canada Inline official website
NIHA-Canada official website

Inline hockey in Canada
National inline hockey teams
Inline hockey